Unakoti (Bengali: ঊনকোটি) is an administrative district in the state of Tripura in northeastern India. It is the least populated district of Tripura, with fourth highest literacy rate. The district has a total of four sub divisions and two blocks.  The district was created in 2012, by bifurcating the North Tripura district with its headquarter in Kailashahar.

History 
The former princely state of Tripura was ruled by Maharajas of Manikya dynasty. It was an independent administrative unit under the Maharaja even during the British rule in India, though this independence was qualified, being subject to the recognition of the British, as the paramount power of each successive ruler.

As per Rajmala, the royal chronology of Tripura, a total of 184 kings ruled over the state before it merged with the Indian Union on October 15 1949. Since then the history of Tripura has been interspersed with various political, economical and social developments. On January 26, 1950 Tripura was accorded the status of a ‘C’ category state and on November 1, 1956, it was recognized as a Union Territory. It gained full statehood on January 21, 1972, as per the North-East Reorganisation Act, 1971.

Initially a one district state, was trifurcated into three Districts w.e.f. 01.09.1970. The North Tripura District started functioning in the office of the Sub-divisional officer at Kailashahar and partly at Kumarghat, later the whole office was shifted to Kailashahar. The Collectorate was shifted to the newly constructed complex at Gournagar on 13.11.1987.

Subsequently, North Tripura District has been bifurcated and a new District namely “Dhalai District” has been inaugurated on 14.04.1995 with district head quarter at Ambassa.

On 21.01.2012 the decision to further bifurcate North Tripura District was accepted and the district “UNAKOTI DISTRICT” was created with its headquarter at Kailashahar.

Etymology
Unakoti derives its name from the Unakoti hill. Unakoti literally meaning, one less a koti in Bengali. It hosts an ancient Shaivite place of worship with huge rock reliefs celebrating Shiva.

Geography
The district is surrounded by Dharmanagar subdivision, Panisagar subdivision and Kanchanpur subdivision of North Tripura district in the Northeast, East and Southeast side respectively. In the southern side, it is surrounded by Kamalpur subdivision and Longthari valley subdivision of Dhalai district. It also shares an international border with Bangladesh in the northern side.

Divisions
The District and divided into two sub-divisions, namely, Kailashahar subdivision and Kumarghat subdivision.

For the purpose of developmental activities it is divided into four Blocks namely Kumarghat, Pecharthal, Chandipur and Gournagar.

Demographics
According to census 2011 Unakoti district has Total population of 2,76,506. Out of this Male are 1,40,210 and, Female are1,36,296, Overall literacy rate (%) is 86.91. Male literacy rate (%) is 90.92, Female literacy rate (%) is 82.79, Female per thousand males are 972.

Climate
The state as whole and Unakoti district in particular has a monsoon type of climate. There is however, difference of temperature between the hills and plains, which ranges between sub-tropical in the plains to temperate climatic conditions found in the hilly areas. 

The topographic features seem to have influenced the climatic condition of the Unakoti district, where the plains are hotter and humid in comparison to the hills, which have a salubrious climate. The four main seasons here are

 Winter season (December to February)
 Pre-monsoon season (March to May)
 Monsoon season (June to September)
 Post Monsoon season (October to November)

The climatic temperature generally ranges in between 10°C and 35°C. The District enjoys coldest season from December to February followed by summer during the months from March to May. The highest temperature is generally recorded in the month of May and the lowest in January. The SouthWest monsoon reaches the State in the months from June to September. Rainy season generally starts by about the end of May but thundershowers usually occur from about April to the break of the monsoon. The rainy season continues up to September. The maximum rainfall is usually recorded during the month of June – July. The months of October and November constitute the post monsoon season.

Gallery

Transport

Roadway
National Highway 8 (NH 8), running from Karimganj in Assam to Sabroom in Tripura, passes through this district.

Railway
Lumding–Sabroom line of Northeast Frontier Railway passes through Unakoti district. The main station in district is Kumarghat railway station, providing connectivity to Tripura capital Agartala and Assam and other major cities of the state like Dharmanagar, Udaipur and Belonia.

References

External links
 Official website

 
Districts of Tripura